Ujar District is one of the 66 districts of Azerbaijan. It is located in the centre of the country and belongs to the Central Aran Economic Region. The district borders the districts of Agdash, Goychay, Kurdamir, and Zardab. Its capital and largest city is Ujar. As of 2020, the district had a population of 89,500.

History 
The name Ucar derives from the Turkic word "Ucqar" meaning "remote", as Ucar was remote from the Shirvanshah capital at Baku, and on the frontier of the Shirvan state.

Before, the territory of the Ujar region was part of the Shirvan Beylerbey, later Shamakhi khanate. On April 10, 1840,  according to the administrative reform, it was the part of Caspian Province, and in 1846, joined the Shamakhi Governorate. After the Shamakhi earthquake in 1859, the centre of the Governorate moved to Baku. In December 1867, Goychay Uyezd was established in the territory of Baku province. At that time, the district was part of the Goychay Uyezd. In 1930, the Uyezd was abolished and the district was transferred to the administrative unit. Thus, the Ujar District was created on 24 January 1939 as an independent administrative unit from part of Goychay region. The territory of the region was changed in 1963. Thus, Zardab district was abolished in 1963 with its territory joined to the Ujar district. In 1965, the Zardab district was separated from Ucar when it was restored as an independent region.

Population 
, Ujar District had an estimated population of 77,900 people, of which 22% were urban dwellers and 78% rural.  The population is 99.7% Azerbaijanis. According to the report of Statistical Committee of Republic, the total number of population in 2010 was 71.9 thousand people. By 2018, increased by 15,800 and reached 87.7.

Rivers and water resources 
Main rivers are Goychay and Turyan (Garasu) rivers. Tikanlichay, one of the main rivers, starts from the south-western slope of the Bazarduzu mountain. The river has 10 branches. The Goychay River starts from the Lahij mountain system - the western slope of Kovdag (1980 m).

Administration 
There are 32 villages and 1 city in Ucar. The largest communities are Qazyan, Müsüslü and Qarabörk.

Chief executives 
 Gyulyushov, Nariman oglu Ibish - from 1994(?) to 29 March 2005
 Gafurov, Arzu Telman oglu - from 29 March 2005 to 5 April 2010
 Mamedov, Yashar oglu Qahraman - since 5 April 2010
 Mamedov, Mansur Hamza oglu - since 27 January 2015

Administration 
Ujar District is divided into 29 villages and 1 city.
 Ujar City
 Məlikballı
 Qazıqumlaq
 Ramal
 Qaradağlı
 Alpout
 Qazyan
 Lək
 Boyat
 Xələc
 Yuxarı Şilyan
 Müsüslü
 Qaracallı
 Bərgüşad
 Yuxarı Çiyni
 Qüləbənd
 Qarabörk
 Rəstəcə

References

 
Districts of Azerbaijan
1939 establishments in Azerbaijan